The Divine Weapon is a 2008 South Korean film.

Plot 
During the reign of King Sejong the Great, Joseon Korea faces increasing hostility from Ming China. Ming China, without restraint, mounts unrelenting demands against the Korean crown, further entrenching distrust and aversion to subservience. Ming China has especially been provoked by a leaked news that Korea had under way an arms development program that would undermine theirs. Mounting pressure by threat of invasion and sending down Emperor's commands requesting tribute pf young Korean girls to be sent to China, to reduce Korea's manpower and debilitate its military capacity, the grip around the throat becomes ever tighter. It seems Joseon's fate is dependent on completing an unfinished project - that of making Singijeon or the Divine Weapon a reality.

In the final battle, severely outnumbered Korean forces (less than 100 men) successfully defeat the thousands of Ming Chinese in armed combat with spears, bombs, and several finished Singijeon via several hwachas. Thousands of Ming Chinese foot soldiers are killed as the arrows in the Singijeon are launched. More are killed with the gunpowder packed inside the arrows (standard Singeijeons). Those in the Ming Chinese army who remained are finished off with the large model Singijeons (대신기전, Grand Singijeon), except one of the nobles who prefers peace over warfare.

Cast 
 Jung Jae-young ... Seol-joo
 Han Eun-jung ... Hong-ri
 Heo Joon-ho ... Chang-kang
 Ahn Sung-ki ... King Sejong
 Jeong Seong-mo ... Sa Ma-soon
 Kim Myeong-soo ... Ggya Oh-ryung
 Lee Do-kyeong ... Hong-man
 Do Yi-seong ... In-ha
 Ryu Hyun-kyung ... Bang-wook
 Seo Joo-seong ... Moo-saeng
 Cha Soon-bae ... Ming1

Release 
The Divine Weapon was released in South Korea on 4 September 2008, topping the box office on its opening weekend with 630,257 admissions. It led the box office for a further two weeks, and as of 9 November had accumulated a total of 3,749,611 admissions.

Reception
The film was heavily criticized by Chinese audiences for historical inaccuracies and revisionism. For example, the movie depicted Ming China and Joseon Korea in conflict around 1448, however in reality two nations never fought and were in fact allies in resisting Japanese invasion. The depicted the tribute of young girls occurred under the Mongol-led Yuan dynasty (1271-1368). The movie also suggested that the Ming dynasty tried to steal multiple rocket carts blueprints from Korea, despite in reality China developed rocket arrows and rocket carts that predates Korean efforts.

Awards and nominations
2008 Blue Dragon Film Awards
 Nomination - Best Director - Kim Yoo-jin
 Nomination - Best Art Direction - Min Eon-ok
 Nomination - Best New Actress - Han Eun-jung

2008 Korean Film Awards
 Nomination - Best Actor - Jung Jae-young
 Nomination - Best Sound - Oh Se-jin

2009 Fajr International Film Festival, "World Panorama" section
 Best Technical and Artistic Achievement

2009 Grand Bell Awards
 Best Film
 Best Editing - Kim Hyeon
 Best Sound - Oh Se-jin
 Nomination - Best Actor - Jung Jae-young
 Nomination - Best Lighting - Im Jae-young
 Nomination - Best Visual Effects - Jeong Seong-jin, Han Young-woo
 Nomination - Best Planning - Lee Young-in

References

External links 
  
 
 
 

2008 films
2000s war drama films
South Korean war drama films
Films set in the 15th century
Films set in the Joseon dynasty
Best Picture Grand Bell Award winners
2000s Korean-language films
Films directed by Kim Yoo-jin
2000s South Korean films